Saint-Régis-du-Coin is a commune in the Loire department in central France.

Geography 
This town of the Loire, which is part of the Pilat Regional Nature Park is located 21 km from Saint-Etienne. His village is situated 1071 m above sea level, so it's a mid-mountain terrain that characterizes the town.

Climate 
Because of its location in the uplands, the climate of the St. Regis-du-Coin is harsh in winter (cold and snow) but mild in summer.

History
The town is recent, it dates only from 1858. Its territory was created from plots taken at the town of Marlhes and Saint-Sauveur-en-Rue. Its name comes from a locality called "The Corner" located on this time, near the present town. It will add "St. Regis" to forgive, as is the oral tradition, poor reception given to someone who would become St. John Francis Regis. Making it the only town in France to carry the name of this apostle of Velay and Vivarais.

Population

Sights  
 The bogs of Gimel.
Bogs of Gimel are a protected site, because they are the largest wetland of the Natural Park of Pilat. Rectangular pits are the mark of a former exploitation, as the hydraulic network witness of the necessary drainage.
 Mount Chaussitre

Galleries

See also
Communes of the Loire department

References

Communes of Loire (department)